The Mount Brydges Bulldogs are a Junior ice hockey team based in Mount Brydges, Ontario, Canada.  They play in the Provincial Junior Hockey League and are three-time provincial champions.

History
The Mount Brydges Bulldogs were founded in 1975 as members of the Western Junior D Hockey League.

The 1983–84 season saw the Bulldogs pull off a 22–7–5 record, which led them on to win their first Western league championship, despite competition from the Exeter Hawks who only suffered a total of two losses during the regular season. In the provincial final, the Bulldogs met the Grand Valley Harvesters of the Northern Junior D Hockey League, winning their first series 4 games to 2.

The Bulldogs were a tough team until the mid-1980s.  In 1988, the Western league absorbed the Southern league and became an eighteen-team super-league. From then into the mid-1990s, the Bulldogs struggled. In 1991, the Western League was disbanded and replaced with the OHA Junior Development League.

The 1996–97 season proved to be one of the best ever for the Bulldogs. At the end of the regular season, the Bulldogs were at the top of the league with 34 wins and only 3 losses. The Bulldogs battled through three rounds of playoffs to meet the Wellesley Applejacks at the  OHAJDL finals. The Bulldogs earned their second OHA Cup with a 4-games-to-none sweep.

The Bulldogs finished the 2000-01 season in eighth place overall with a record of 23 wins and 14 losses. The Bulldogs defeated their competition in the first three rounds of the playoffs to win their conference title. In the provincial championship final they met the Wellesley Applejacks, who were caught flat-footed and defeated 4 games to 1. This marked the Bulldogs' third provincial championship.

The 2004–05 season was a strong one for the Bulldogs who finished sixth place overall in the OHAJDL. They again battled through the first three rounds of the playoffs, winning their conference. In the end, they met the Hagersville Hawks, an opponent that was not to be denied an OHA Cup. The Bulldogs lost the series 4-games-to-1.

The Bulldogs finished the 2005-06 season with a .500 record and ranked eleventh place overall. In the first round of the playoffs, the Bulldogs pulled off a major upset knocking off the number one ranked Mitchell Hawks 4-games-to-2. In round 2,  they met the Thamesford Trojans who defeated the Bulldogs 4-games-to-1.

Mount Brydges pulled off a 21-win season in 2006-07, and finished in tenth place overall. In the first round of the playoffs the lost 4-games-to-1.

The 2007-2008 season proved to be their best regular season in franchise history. With 36 wins and only 3 losses, the Bulldogs were number one in the league with 73 points. The Bulldogs swept their way through the first two rounds of the playoffs before meeting the perennial powerhouse Thamesford Trojans in the Yeck Conference finals. Thamesford powered past Mount Brydges 4 games to none, en route to their 2008 championship.

The 2008-2009 season was yet again another great season in the history of the franchise. With 33 wins and only 6 losses, finishing first overall. The Bulldogs yet again swept their way to the Conference Final before losing to the eventual league champions North Middlesex Stars 4 games to 1.

The 2009-2010 season brought changes within the organization resulting in a third-place finish for the regular season and first-round knockout in the playoffs.

During the 2017-2018 season, the Bulldogs and North Middlesex Stars engaged in the inaugural season series entitled the Battle of Highway 81. The Bulldogs would go on to win the series on the final day of the regular season and down the Stars by a 3-2 season tally.

Battle of Highway 81 Series Scores 2017-18:
Game 1: Stars 4-2 Bulldogs,
Game 2: Bulldogs 3-1 Stars,
Game 3: Stars 5-2 Bulldogs,
Game 4: Bulldogs 5-2 Stars,
Game 5: Bulldogs 4-1 Stars

Season-by-season standings

Playoffs
1984 Won league, Won OHA Championship
Mount Brydges Bulldogs defeated Grand Valley Harvesters 4-games-to-2 in OHA final
1997 Won league
Mount Brydges Bulldogs defeated Wellesley Applejacks 4-games-to-none in final
2001 Won league, Won OHA Championship
Mount Brydges Bulldogs defeated Wellesley Applejacks 4-games-to-1 in final
2005 Won League, Lost OHA Championship
Hagersville Hawks defeated Mount Brydges Bulldogs 4-games-to-1 in final
2006 Lost conference semi-final
Thamesford Trojans defeated Mount Brydges Bulldogs 4-games-to-1 in conf. semi-final
2008 Lost conference final
Mount Brydges Bulldogs defeated Exeter Hawks 4-games-to-none in conf. quarter-final
Mount Brydges Bulldogs defeated West Lorne Lakers 4-games-to-none in conf. semi-final
Thamesford Trojans defeated Mount Brydges Bulldogs 4-games-to-0 in conf. final
2009 Lost conference Final
Mount Brydges Bulldogs defeated Exeter Hawks 4-games-to-none in conf. quarter final
Mount Brydges Bulldogsdefeated Port Stanley Sailors 4-games-to-none in conf. semi final
North Middlesex Stars defeated Mount Brydges Bulldogs 4-games-to-one in conf. final
2010 lost quarter final 
defeated 4-games-to-none
2011Lost semi final
Mount Brydges Bulldogs defeated Lucan Irish 4-games-to-three in quarter final
Thamesford Trojans defeated Mount Brydges Bulldogs 4-games-to-none in semi final

Notable alumni
Jason Williams

References

External links
Official OHA Bulldogs' Website

Southern Ontario Junior Hockey League teams